Ieva Narkutė–Šeduikienė alias Jieva (Kaunas, 1987) is a Lithuanian singer-songwriter.

She grew up in Šiauliai and her parents are musicians. She studied psychology and her song "Raudoni vakarai" was an important hit.

Prizes
 2007 – Award Saulius Mykolaitis;
2011 – Musical Awards T.Ė.T.Ė., best singer

Discography
 Vienas (2013)
 Švelnesnis žvėris (2014)
 Ieva Narkutė sutinka Lietuvos valstybinį simfoninį orkestrą (2016)
 Kai muzika baigias (2018)

See also
Sung poetry

External links and references

1987 births
Living people
21st-century Lithuanian women singers